Rekapitulacija 1980–1984 is a retrospective album by the Slovenian industrial group Laibach. It was first released as a double LP boxset in 1985, and re-released on CD in 1987.

On the cover is a kozolec, an ancient iconic Slovene hayrack.

Background 

In January 1984 Laibach signed a contract with independent label Walter Ulbricht Schallfolien, from Hamburg, for a double LP retrospective release entitled REKAPITULACIJA 1980-1984 (RECAPITULATION 1980-1984).  The album was released on 9 May 1985.  This was the first of the group's records to gain an international release. The track "Ti, ki izzivaš" includes a sample from the soundtrack of the movie Psycho.

Track listing 

 "Cari Amici" (English: Dear Friends) - 2:07
 "Zmagoslavje volje" (Triumph des Willens) (English: The Triumph of Will) - 4:48
 "Jaruzelsky" - 4:49
 "Smrt za smrt (Tod für Tod)" (English: Death for Death) - 2:16
 "Sila (Macht)" (English: Power) - 4:01
 "Dokumenti (Dokumente") / "Sredi bojev (Inmitten von Kämpfen)" (English: Documents / In The Midst of Struggles) 12:16
 "Panorama 14" / "Mi kujemo bodočnost (Wir schmieden die Zukunft)" (English: Panorama 14 \ We Are Forging The Future) - 5:38
 "Brat moj (Bruder mein)" (English: Brother of Mine) - 6:03
 "Slovenska žena (Slowenische Frau)" (English: The Slovene Woman) - 4:03
 "Boji (Kämpfe)" (English: Fights) - 8:08
 "Ti, ki izzivaš (Du, der Du herausforderst)" (English: You, who challenges) - 6:07
 "Perspektive (Perspektiven)" (English: Perspective) - 4:43
 "Mars" - 0:22

Total time: 65:21

NB: Reedited in 2002 with the following bonus tracks:

 "Vade retro Satanas"
 "Smrt za smrt"

References 

Laibach (band) albums
1985 compilation albums